Lacadena or La Cadena may refer to:

Places 
Rural Municipality of Lacadena No. 228, Saskatchewan, Canada
Lacadena, Saskatchewan, an unincorporated community in the rural municipality
La Cadena, a mountain in the Frigiliana municipality
Estero La Cadena, a river of Chile

People 
Alfonso Lacadena (1964–2018), a Spanish archaeologist, historian, and epigraphist
Juan Ramón Lacadena (born 1934), a Spanish agronomical engineer
Rodrigo de la Cadena (born 1988), Mexican singer, performer, songwriter, radio host and musician

See also

 
 
 Cadena (disambiguation)